"Back in Your Own Backyard" is a popular song. Officially the credits show it as written by Al Jolson, Billy Rose, and Dave Dreyer; in fact, Billy Rose was exclusively a lyricist, Dreyer a composer, and Al Jolson a performer who was often given credits so he could earn some more money, so the actual apportionment of the credits would be likely to be music by Dreyer, lyrics by Rose, and possibly some small contribution by Jolson.

A popular recording by Ruth Etting, made on January 3, 1928, was issued by Columbia Records as catalog number 1288-D, with the flip side "When You're with Somebody Else". Jolson also recorded the song in 1928, on March 8, with Bill Wirges' Orchestra for Brunswick Records (catalog number 3867) with the flip side "Ol' Man River".

Other recordings
1928: Eva Taylor - recorded on June 2, 1928, for Okeh Records (catalog No. 8585).
1938: Billie Holiday - recorded January 12, 1938, for Vocalion Records (catalog No. 4029).
1947: Al Jolson - re-recorded on June 9, 1947, for Decca Records (catalog No. 24108).
1950: It was subsequently revived by Patti Page in a recording made on June 16, 1950. The Page recording was issued by Mercury Records as catalog number 5463. It entered the Billboard chart on October 7, 1950, at No. 23, lasting only that one week.
1954: Bing Crosby recorded the song for use on his radio show and it was subsequently included in the box set The Bing Crosby CBS Radio Recordings (1954–56) issued by Mosaic Records (catalog MD7-245) in 2009. 
1955: Margaret Whiting
1958: The Andrews Sisters - for their album The Andrews Sisters Sing the Dancing '20s.
1958: Eydie Gormé - for her album Eydie Gormé – Vamps The Roaring 20's
1958: Peggy Lee - in her album Jump for Joy
1959: Brenda Lee - for her album Grandma, What Great Songs You Sang!
1959: Vera Lynn - included the album Vera Lynn Sings Songs of the Twenties
1962: Nancy Wilson - for her album Hello Young Lovers
1963: Sammy Davis Jr. - for his album As Long as She Needs Me
1968: Eddie Fisher - for his album You Ain't Heard Nothin' Yet
2004: Madeleine Peyroux - for the album Got You on My Mind

Film appearances
1929: Say It with Songs - sung by Al Jolson
1939: That's Right—You're Wrong - played by the Kay Kyser Band at the radio program
1943: Silver Spurs - sung by Roy Rogers
1949: Jolson Sings Again - performed by Larry Parks (dubbed by Al Jolson)

References 

1928 songs
Al Jolson songs
Nancy Wilson (jazz singer) songs
Okeh Records singles
Patti Page songs
Songs with lyrics by Billy Rose
Songs with music by Dave Dreyer
Songs written by Al Jolson